The North Shore is a region in the U.S. state of Massachusetts, loosely defined as the coastal area between Boston and New Hampshire. The region is made up both of a rocky coastline, dotted with marshes and wetlands, as well as several beaches and natural harbors. The North Shore is an important historical, cultural, and economic region of Massachusetts.  The southern part of the region includes Boston's densely populated inner northeast suburbs, including Salem.  At the center of the North Shore lies its most prominent geographic feature, Cape Ann, with numerous small fishing towns, and at the northern end lies the Merrimack Valley, which was a major locus of the Industrial Revolution in the United States.

It contains the cities of Salem, known worldwide as the site of the Salem witch trials; and Gloucester, site of Charles Olson's The Maximus Poems, and of Sebastian Junger's 1997 creative nonfiction book The Perfect Storm and its 2000 film adaptation. Beverly was home to author John Updike until his death.  Salisbury Beach State Reservation, lying within the town of Salisbury, Massachusetts, is a popular beach resort with over 1 million annual visitors.

The region also prominently figures in the works of Nathaniel Hawthorne and H. P. Lovecraft, notably the latter's The Shadow over Innsmouth, as well as New England poets T. S. Eliot and Robert Lowell. Martin Scorsese's 2010 feature film Shutter Island, set on a fictional Boston Harbor island, was partly shot on location on the North Shore. Kenneth Lonergan's 2016 film Manchester by the Sea is set in the eponymous seaside town, and major portions of it were filmed in Gloucester, Beverly and other North Shore communities. Sian Heder's 2021 Academy Award-winning feature CODA was set in Gloucester and filmed there, along with other North Shore locations.

Definition
The North Shore has no fixed definition as a region. It may include only those communities between Boston and Cape Ann, as defined by the Metropolitan Area Planning Council (whose purview does not go beyond Greater Boston); or the larger part of Essex County, including parts of the Merrimack Valley, as defined by the North Shore Chamber of Commerce. The Massachusetts Office of Coastal Zone Management, which defines regions in terms of watershed, refers to the North Shore as the coastal region of Massachusetts north of Boston stretching from Salisbury to Revere, including the inland city of Amesbury.

Coastal
North Shore of Massachusetts could be taken to mean the entire coast of Massachusetts from New Hampshire to Boston (listed in order, north-to-south):

Economic

The Boston Metropolitan Area Planning Council's North Shore Task Force, a regional planning agency, defines the North Shore as also encompassing Cape Ann and several inland communities. When combined with the North Shore Chamber of Commerce's definition of the region, the North Shore comprises the following cities and towns:

Cultural
The North Shore has historically been viewed as a wealthy, exclusive collection of towns and fishing villages, but also contains some working-class cities and suburbs of Boston. In 1893, The New York Times described the region as a notable summer destination for the socialites, politicians, and businessmen of New York and New England, dotted with hotels, cottages, and burgeoning gentlemen's clubs. Salem, known worldwide as the location of the Salem witch trials; the working-class fishing city of Gloucester; and the region's many beaches make it a popular tourist destination.

History
The North Shore communities have varied and rich histories: Gloucester was America's first fishing community; Salem was the location of the infamous witch trials as well as one of the largest centers of shipping and sixth largest city in early America.  The hysteria that led to the witch trials began in the part of Salem that is now Danvers.  Lynn was once the center of the American shoe industry.  Saugus is home to the first integrated ironworks in North America. Peabody had the largest concentration of tanneries in the world; and Beverly and Marblehead often dispute over which town was the birthplace of the American Navy. Newburyport was well known for producing clipper ships and for a brief time in history was the richest city in the Union; it is also the birthplace of the United States Coast Guard. Newburyport maintains the largest collection of Federal period commercial and residential architecture in the nation.

Sites of interest

The Peabody Essex Museum – a museum with large collections of maritime artifacts and Asian art.
National Register of Historic Places listings in Salem, Massachusetts
The Salem Witch Museum
Historic Downtown Salem
The Salem Seaport
The Saugus Iron Works
The Swampscott Fish House – the oldest active fish house in the country.
Newburyport's historic district maintains the nation's largest collection of Federal period architecture
Historic Gloucester and Rockport Seaports
North Shore Navigators collegiate-league baseball team
The North Shore Music Theatre in Beverly, New England's largest regional theater
The Larcom Theatre in Beverly built in 1912 is the oldest, operating Vaudeville theatre in the region, also once home to Le Grand David.
The Cabot Street Cinema Theatre in Beverly was home to Le Grand David, the world's longest-running resident stage magic show. until 2013.
Castle Hill in Ipswich
Revere Beach, the first public beach in the United States, in Revere
The Rebecca Nurse Homestead in Danvers, the only home of a victim of the Salem witch trials open to the public

See also
Greater Boston
Merrimack Valley
South Shore (Massachusetts)

References

Further reading 
 Garland, Joseph E., Boston's Gold Coast : the North Shore, 1890-1929, Boston, MA : Little, Brown & Co., 1981.

Regions of Massachusetts